Girls Without Tomorrow aka. Call Girl '88 (應召女郎1988) is a 1988 Hong Kong film directed by David Lam Tak Luk and Wong Chi.

It was followed by a sequel in 1992: Girls Without Tomorrow 1992.

Plot
Female actress Jenny (Maggie Cheung) is actually a high-class escort; Mei-Feng (Fung Bo-Bo) chooses to become a prostitute to pay her husband’s medical bills; Shan-Shan (Carrie Ng) unwillingly becomes a prostitute to pay her mother’s medical bills; Ling-Yu (Elsie Chan) is Shan-Shan’s optimistic roommate.

Cast and roles
 Elsie Chan – Ling-Yu
 Maggie Cheung – Jenny Lin
 Fung Bo-Bo – Mei-Feng / Tsui Tsui
 Stanley Fung – Fang
 Lau Siu-Ming – Ling-Yu's Godfather
 Alan Chui Chung-San – Brother Two  
 Lin Chung – Uncle Yen
 Carrie Ng – Shan-Shan
 Kent Tong – Television Actor

See also
 Prostitution in Hong Kong

External links
 
 HK cinemagic entry

Hong Kong drama films
1988 films
Films directed by David Lam
1980s Hong Kong films